The Wharton India Economic Forum (WIEF), established in 1996 at The Wharton School, is a student-run business forum in the United States focused on India. WIEF is one of the largest India-based economic and business conferences in the United States. It is attended by over 800 people annually and receives extensive media coverage in India and the wider business by leading publications, such as The Wall Street Journal, Forbes, The New York Times, The Economic Times and The Times of India.

WIEF's describes its mission as to "engage the world's attention on India's enormous potential and the limitless possibilities the country offers".

Speakers at the pre-2012 conferences 

Government & Policy
Dr. A.P.J Abdul Kalam, 11th President of India
P. Chidambaram, Home Affairs Minister and former Finance Minister of India
Henry Paulson, 74th United States Treasury Secretary and former CEO and Chairman of Goldman Sachs
Dr. Montek Singh Ahluwalia, Deputy Chairman, Planning Commission, Government of India
Shashi Tharoor, Member of Indian Parliament and former Under Secretary General of the United Nations
Praful Patel, Minister of State for Civil Aviation, Government of India
Sachin Pilot, Minister of State, Ministry of Communications & Information Technology, Government of India
Naveen Jindal, Member of Indian Parliament
Kalpana Kochhar, Country Head India, International Monetary Fund

Industry
Anil Ambani, Chairman, Reliance Anil Dhirubhai Ambani Group
Mukesh Ambani, Chairman and MD, Reliance Industries
Sunil Mittal, Founder, Chairman and Group CEO, Bharti Enterprises
N. R. Narayana Murthy, Non-Executive Chairman and Chief Mentor, Infosys
Nandan Nilekani, Chairman, Unique Identification Authority of India and former CEO, Infosys
Kushal Pal Singh, Chairman and CEO, DLF
Rahul Bajaj, Chairman, Bajaj Group
Adi Godrej, Chairman, Godrej Group
Kiran Mazumdar-Shaw, Chairman & Managing Director, Biocon Limited

Finance
Jim Rogers, Financial Investor and Author
Deepak Parekh, Chairman, HDFC
Chanda Kochhar, CEO & MD, ICICI Bank Limited
George Soros, Chairman, Soros Fund Management and the Open Society Institute
Vikram Akula, CEO and Founder, SKS Microfinance

Media & Entertainment
Abhishek Bachchan, Actor, Bollywood
Anil Kapoor, Actor, Bollywood
Vidya Balan, Actress, Bollywood
Karan Johar, Indian Film Director, Producer, and TV celebrity
Rakeysh Omprakash Mehra, Indian Filmmaker and Screenwriter
Rohan Sippy, Indian Film Director
Shankar Mahadevan, Indian Music Composer and Singer
Subhash Chandra, Chairman, Zee Entertainment Enterprises Limited (ZEEL)

Sports
Sunil Gavaskar, former Indian Cricketer
Vijay Amritraj, former Indian Tennis Player and Sports Commentator
Geet Sethi, Professional Billiards Player

Other
Dominic Barton, Global Managing Director, McKinsey & Company

16th WIEF, 2012

The 16th annual Wharton India Economic Forum was held on January 9, 2012 in Mumbai, India. This was the first time the WIEF was held in India.

The speakers included:

K.V. Kamath, Chairman, Infosys Limited
Ajay Piramal, Chairman, Piramal Enterprises Limited
Chanda Kochhar, MD & CEO, ICICI Bank
Keki Mistry, Vice Chairman and CEO, HDFC Limited
Niranjan Hiranandani, Co-Founder and MD, Hiranandani Group
R Gopalakrishnan, Director, Tata Sons
Vinod Rai, Comptroller & Auditor General of India
Gunit Chadha, MD & CEO, Deutsche Bank India
Manish Kejriwal, ex-India Head, Temasek Holdings

17th WIEF, 2013 

Keynote Speakers

 Montek Singh Ahluwalia (via live videoconference) - Deputy Chairman, Planning Commission of India
 Arvind Kejriwal, Founder, Aam Aadmi Party
 Ron Somers - President, US-India Business Council
 Dilip Cherian - Consulting Partner, Perfect Relations (Moderator)

Milind Deora opted out for an unspecified reason.

Media and Entertainment Panelists

 Javed Akhtar - Poet, Lyricist, and Scriptwriter
 Shabana Azmi - Actress
 Boman Irani - Actor
 Aseem Chhabra - Freelance writer (Moderator)
 Sudhir Mishra - Director and Screenwriter

Women's Empowerment Panelists

 Lakshmi Pratury - Co-Host, TEDIndia 
 Shabana Azmi - Actress
 Vrinda Grover - Lawyer, High Court India
 Jaideep Bose - Editorial Director, Times of India Group (Moderator)

Private Equity/Venture Capital Panelists

 Shankar Narayanan - MD, The Carlyle Group India

Finance Panelists

 L.N. Balaji - President, ITC Infotech USA
 Thomas Brunner - Partner & General Counsel, LeapFrog Investments
 Amit Saxena - CEO, Karvy Financial Services Limited

Entrepreneurship Panelists

 Sasha Mirchandani -Managing Director and Founder, Kae Capital
 Samir Mitra - Advisor, Prime Minister of India
 Aneesh Reddy - Co-Founder and CEO, Capillary Technologies
 Devita Saraf - Chief Executive Officer, Vu Technologies

Narendra Modi controversy 

In 2013, the WIEF organizers invited the Gujarat chief minister Narendra Modi to deliver the keynote address via video-conferencing. Toorjo Ghose, an assistant professor at the University of Pennsylvania  and a small group of colleagues put together a petition after learning about Wharton's invitation to Modi. Kasturi Sen,  a Philadelphia-based attorney, created a group on Facebook and initially hosted the petition there.  The petition cited the revocation of visa to Modi in 2005 by the US state department. They were joined by Ania Loomba and Suvir Kaul, both Indian-American UPenn professors, who were critical of Modi's handling of the 2002 Hindu-Muslim riots, started formal a petition demanding the cancellation of the invitation, failing which they would protest his virtual presence at the event.

The petition was sent to  Amy Gutmann, the UPenn president. The university leadership stepped in to diffuse what it saw as a potentially explosive situation.
The WIEF organizers had to cancel the invitation, even though they stood by the earlier decision to invite Modi. They stated that they wanted to avoid putting Modi in a "compromising position". At the time of the decision, the petition had been signed by around 135 people, and the number of signatories grew to 250 later. A senior Wharton official distanced Wharton from the decision stating “Make no mistake, the move to not have Modi was a result of UPenn, not Wharton,”  pointing to the fact that not a single Wharton faculty member had signed the petition demanding cancellation of Modi's speech.

In Modi's support, the Shiv Sena leader Suresh Prabhakar Prabhu scrapped his visit to Wharton. Another speaker, the Wall Street Journal writer and journalist Sadanand Dhume, also pulled out from the forum in protest. He was replaced by Sudhir Parikh, a New Jersey-based eminent physician, philanthropist, publisher and Padma Shri awardee. However, Parikh too withdrew from the conference as a mark of protest. He stated, "The manner in which the committee has been pressurised to rescind its invitation to Gujarat Chief Minister Narendra Modi on entirely suspicious grounds, I feel the intellectual integrity of the forum has been compromised." Ron Somers, also a keynote speaker, termed the decision to drop Modi as "unfortunate and disrespectful", but said that he would attend the event in order to make his point about free speech.  Another keynote speaker Mohandas Pai also backed out complaining about mistreatment of Indians outside India; he mentioned the "shabby" treatment of Narendra Modi among other incidents such as the Italian marines controversy, Pakistan's reaction to Afzal Guru's hanging and Sri Lanka's treatment of Indian fishermen. The U.S. Congressman Eni Faleomavaega expressed disappointment at the decision, criticizing the protesters as "a segment of professors and students who are reaching beyond the law and coming awfully close to violating the rights of others who have a different view". Several others, including Rajiv Malhotra and the Indian Union Minister Shashi Tharoor also stated that Modi should not have been disinvited.

The Adani group, the platinum sponsors of the event, withdrew their sponsorship. Subsequently, Viacom 18's Colors, the silver sponsors, also pulled out. Hexaware, the bronze sponsor, also withdrew sponsorship, saying that its chairman Atul Nishar (a keynote speaker) would be unable to attend the event due to other business engagements.

Some media outlets reported that Arvind Kejriwal had been invited instead of Modi, but Kejriwal clarified that he had received the invitation several days before the decision to drop Modi was made. Kejriwal also expressed his disapproval of the decision to drop Modi.

After the controversy, the organizers announced that no media organizations other than TV Asia would be allowed to cover the event. This was for the first time in the 17 years history of the event that media was not given free access to cover the forum. A coalition of activists opposed to the decision came together under the banner of Americans for Free Speech, and organized a peaceful protest at the venue.

The cancellation of Modi's speech ignited a debate on free speech on UPenn campus. Assem Shukla, Associate Professor of Surgery  at the Perelman School of Medicine at the University of Pennsylvania stated: "Penn’s tradition of free speech was celebrated when extreme anti-Israel speakers, Louis Farrakhan of the Nation of Islam and radical Occupy Wall Street protesters held sway on campus. But free speech became an empty homily when it came to the speaker selection of a group of Indian-American business school students" Loomba stated that uninviting a speaker is also freedom of speech. She said "Modi supporters can beam him in, but not in my house".

WIEF Chairs 
 2023 : Shuchi Maheshwari . Ishwar Prasad . Nayan Bader . Sharanya Sahai . Rhea Grover
 2022 : Alekhya Audi . Harshit Sohu . Meghank Garg . Gautam . Mansukh
 2021 : Rishabh Jain . Divya Kamerkar . Gaurav Lulu . Devika Mittal . Anooj Vikam
 2020 : Anirudh Viswanathan . Noopur Kamal . Prahal Ghai . Surekha Cherukuri
2019 : Juhi Bhatnagar . Kartik Das . Khushboo Goel . Sonal Panda . Swati Ganeti
 2018 : Ankit Agarwal · Hena Mehta · Abhinav Prateek · Twishmay Shankar
 2017 :  Aman Jain · Ankita Bajaj · Divya Menon · Praveen Chunduru
 2016 :  Varun Udeshi · Vibhav Chokhani · Vidur Mahajan · Vikram Arumilli
 2015 :  Anna Ahmed · Kirti Choudhary · Alvira Rao · Ankit Saxena
 2014 :  Nikhil Khosla · Aditi Ravichandar · Shweta Singh · Manoj Vasudevan
 2013 :  Akshay Bhushan · Salil Gupta · Tanmay Mishra · Tegh Singh Bedi
 2012 :  Shuchi Pandya · Parth Shah · Shamik Shah · Tahem Veer Verma
 2011 :  Tushar Aggarwal · Rohit Chauhan · Aditya Dada · Saksham Karwal · Derek Kightlinger
 2010 :  Rahul Jetley · Vikramjit Singh · Sathyanarayan Anand · Nina Chandra · Jay Raghavan
 2009 :  Arjun Ghose · Arjun Madan · Anshul Mittal
 2008 :  Vivek Garg · Abhishek Gupta · Vivek Garg · Akshay Madhavan
 2006 :  Raj Pandey · Ashish Khemka · Piyush Jain · Sameera Chilakapati
 2005 :  Hari Prakash · Amit Soni · Abhishek Chauhan · Kanush Chaudhary
 2004 :  Vijay Shreedhar · Samarth Singh · Kunal Bahl
 2003 :  Nikhil Sawhney · Niraj Shah · Aditya Talwar
 2002 :  Kiran Hebbar · Rushabh Kapashi · Anirudh Patni
 2001 :  Sarin Suvarna · Venkatesh Saha
 2000 :  Ashesh Badani · Saahil Mahajan
 1999 :  Sujith Banerjee · Ankur Daga
 1998 :  Manju Chandrasekhar · Shannon Shah
 1997 :  Khawar Mann · Prashant Mehta
 1996 :  Vinnie Badinehal · Anjan Malik · Vikram Limaye (Founders)

References

External links 
WIEF - Official Website

University of Pennsylvania
Business conferences
India-focused think tanks
Recurring events established in 1996
1996 establishments in Pennsylvania